Bitumastic Football Club, or short Bitumastic, is a Ugandan football club from Kampala. They play in the Second division of Ugandan football, the Ugandan Big League.

In 1967 the team has won the second and the last edition of the unofficial competition of the Ugandan Super League. The official competition started on 1968.

Stadium
Currently the team plays at the 20200 capacity Muteesa II Stadium.

Honours
Ugandan Super League (unofficial competition)
Champion (1): 1967

Performance in CAF competitions
African Cup of Champions Clubs: 1 appearance
1967 – Prelimanary Round

References

External links

Football clubs in Uganda